McMasterville is a municipality in southwestern Quebec, Canada on the Richelieu River in La Vallée-du-Richelieu Regional County Municipality. The population as of the 2016 Canadian Census was 5,695. It is within the Administrative Region of Montérégie.

History
The town was founded in 1917 to house workers of the Canadian Explosives Limited which operated until 1998. The town is named after the first chairman of that company, William McMaster.

Geography
McMasterville is located along the Richelieu river, on the shore facing Mont St-Hilaire and Otterburn Park.

Demographics

Population
Population trend:

Language
Mother tongue language (2016)

Education
The town is host to the École d'éducation internationale which offers secondary level education where students can follow the International Baccalaureate Middle Years Programme as defined by the IBO. A primary school, École la Farandole, is also present.

The South Shore Protestant Regional School Board previously served the municipality.

Transportation
Since 2000, McMasterville is served by the McMasterville commuter rail station on the Réseau de transport métropolitain's Mont-Saint-Hilaire line. Local bus service is provided by the RTM.

See also
List of municipalities in Quebec

References

Incorporated places in La Vallée-du-Richelieu Regional County Municipality
Municipalities in Quebec
Greater Montreal